Make Believe may refer to:

 Make believe, a form of play

Literature
 Make Believe Stories, a children's book series
 Make Believe: A Terry Dowling Reader, a 2009 book by Terry Dowling

Music 
 Make Believe (band), an indie rock band

Albums 
 Make Believe (Jessica Molaskey album), 2004
 Make Believe (Pineforest Crunch album), 1996
 Make Believe (Platinum Weird album), 2006
 Make Believe (Weezer album), 2005
 Make Believe, a 1994 album by Mr. Rocket Baby, fronted by Johnny Goudie
 Make Believe, a recording produced by FilKONtario

Songs 
 "Make Believe" (Jerome Kern song), from the musical Show Boat, 1927
 "Make Believe" (Sibel Redžep song), 2008
 "Make Believe" (Toto song), 1982
 "Make Believe", composed by Benny Davis and Jack Shilkret; see 1921 in music
 "Make Believe", by Angra from Holy Land
 "Make Believe", by Backstreet Boys from In a World Like This
 "Make Believe", by Juice Wrld from Death Race for Love
 "Make Believe", by Kelly Rowland from Here I Am
 "Make Believe", by Kero Kero Bonito from Time 'n' Place
 "Make Believe", by Korn from Untouchables
 "Make Believe", by Memphis May Fire from Remade in Misery
 "Make Believe", by the Pixies, a B-side of the single "Velouria"
 "Make Believe", by Sarah Brightman from the soundtrack of Granpa
 "Make Believe", by Silversun Pickups from Neck of the Woods
 "Make Believe", by Wind featuring Tony Orlando

Television episodes 
 "Make Believe" (The Bill)
 "Make Believe" (Blue Murder)
 "Make Believe" (Casualty)
 "Make Believe" (McLeod's Daughters)

Other uses 
 "make.believe", a slogan used by Sony
 Make Believe (horse), a racehorse

See also 
 "It's Only Make Believe", a 1958 song by Conway Twitty
 "Making Believe", a 1955 song by Jimmy Work, popularized by Kitty Wells
 Land of Make Believe (disambiguation)